Alec Gilroy is a fictional character from the British ITV soap opera Coronation Street, played by Roy Barraclough. The character made several appearances in the show as a small-time talent agent, the first in 1972, and later as a series regular from 1986 to 1992. He reappeared briefly in July 1995, and returned for a longer stint between April 1996 and December 1998. Alec is best known for his tempestuous marriage to long-running character Bet Lynch (Julie Goodyear).

Storylines
Alec is introduced as the manager of a Working Men's Club, but soon progressed to being a theatrical agent with acts such as Rita Littlewood (Barbara Knox) under his control. In 1986, Alec took over the Graffiti Club on Rosamund Street, which enjoyed increased trade due to the fire at the Rovers Return. Through this Alec met Bet Lynch (Julie Goodyear). It was after meeting Bet that Alec became a regular in Coronation Street and his character was fully explored by the show's writers.

Alec was mugged in September 1988, which caused Bet to wonder if he was operating an insurance fiddle. Cecil Newton (Kenneth Alan Taylor) and the police suspected the same, but on this occasion Alec had been telling the truth and was being honest. He was deeply hurt that nobody had believed him. In 1992, Alec left Bet after being offered a full-time job with Sunliners in Southampton.

Alec later returned in July 1995 to visit his granddaughter Vicky (Chloe Newsome), revealing that he was the regional manager of a travel agents, called Sunliners. He disapproved of Vicky's fiancé, Steve McDonald (Simon Gregson), believing that Steve was only after Vicky because of her money. Alec tried to bribe Steve into calling the wedding off and leaving Vicky but was unsuccessful. Vicky severed ties with her grandfather and left for St. Lucia with Steve where they married. Alec refused to say goodbye to them and returned to Southampton.

Alec returned permanently in April 1996. In May 1997 he was made redundant from Sunliners. This didn't keep Alec down for too long, however, as he began a partnership with Jack (Bill Tarmey) and Vera Duckworth (Liz Dawn) at The Rovers Return, since Alec helped bail Jack and Vera out of a VAT bill.

In July 1998, Alec saved Rita Sullivan's (Barbara Knox) life after discovering her unconscious from carbon monoxide poisoning in her flat. It was caused by a faulty gas fire that Steve had fitted. The two subsequently became close, and Alec proposed to Rita. She accepted the proposal and when they both got cold feet, Alec decided to fit a door between their adjoining flats. They were both happy with the arrangement, ignoring the sniggers from other residents of the street.

Relations between Alec and the Duckworths soon became very strained and they finally agreed to dissolve their partnership, with Alec paying £30,000 for Jack and Vera's share of the business. However, Alec allowed them to continue living and working at the Rovers. This arrangement didn't work out, and when Jack and Vera wanted to spend Christmas in Blackpool, Alec refused. They ignored him and still went, causing Alec to change the locks. Rita thought that Alec had gone too far, contacting the Duckworths in Blackpool and apologising. A three-day siege took place with no one willing to back down. When Alec discovered it was Rita who had phoned the Duckworths, he felt totally betrayed, and showing that money meant far more to him than affection, ended their relationship. To Rita's dismay Alec boarded up the doorway between their flats.

When Vicky unexpectedly turned up at Christmas 1998, it gave Alec the chance to contemplate his life and reassess his priorities. Alec suggested to Vicky that he could go into partnership with her at her new wine bar in Brighton. Alec jumped at the chance to get away, selling the Rovers to Natalie Barnes (Denise Welch), and leaving the street.

Development

Departures

In 1988, with his contract due to expire, Barraclough decided to quit the programme, citing typecasting as a reason for his departure. His exit storyline was in early planning stages when he had a surprise change of heart, as Bill Podmore recalls: "He insisted on leaving before he became better known as Alec Gilroy than Roy Barraclough, and all my efforts to dissuade him failed. Suddenly, out of the blue, he had a change of heart and the scriptwriters were spared the task of inventing a plausible exit for Alec. Barraclough references this in a 1990 interview: "For the foreseeable future, I will continue playing Alec because I'm enjoying it, but two years ago I thought I was going to pack it all in. The actor's instinct is to do it, move on and tackle another challenge. With soap, once you have established the character, it's just a case of learning a different situation each week. There's nothing else to explore. But Granada outlined all sorts of interesting ideas they had to develop the character and it sounded smashing."

Barraclough remained non-committal about his future with Coronation Street, a situation not helped by the addition of a third weekly episode in October 1989. Barraclough said: "It's damned hard work. If you're featured prominently in a storyline for five or six weeks, the pressure begins to get to you and the strain really starts to tell. It's very much bed and work. At the moment it's OK, but one could foresee a time when it could all get too much. I spent my life permanently tense." In 1992, Barraclough quit the Street, and this time he did not change his mind. Although he expressed a desire for Alec to be killed off, writers instead chose to send him away to Southampton to resume his entertainment career, believing that Bet's new status as a separated woman had dramatic potential.

When Julie Goodyear decided to leave her role as Bet Lynch after 25 years in 1995, Roy Barraclough was persuaded to return as Alec for a storyline which saw the Gilroys reunite to stop Vicky marrying Steve McDonald. The story saw Bet and Alec pick up where they left off, entertaining viewers with their bickering one last time. Alec next appeared in direct-to-video Coronation Street - The Feature Length Special, also in 1995, before returning to the regular programme full-time from April 1996 onwards. In September 1998, tabloids carried the story of Barraclough's resignation from the Street, with the Daily Mirror carrying a quote from the actor: "It's true I've told them I want to go at the end of my six-month contract. It's hard work these days and I've just completed a 19-week stint at the studios." His final episode aired in December 1998.

Reception
The character has been described as "squat and snivelling", and not one of the "better choices" of Bet. He has also been described as being "Bet's long-suffering inamorata".

References

Coronation Street characters
Fictional bartenders
Television characters introduced in 1972
Male characters in television